Lough Derg or Loch Derg is a lake in County Donegal, Republic of Ireland. It is best known for St Patrick's Purgatory, a site of pilgrimage on Station Island in the lake.

It has stocks of pike, perch and brown trout for angling.

Annual pilgrimage

The traditional three-day pilgrimage follows a one-thousand-year-old pattern.  It begins on any day between 1 June and 13 August and lasts three days during which participants may only have one Lough Derg meal each day (black tea/coffee, dry toast, oat cakes, water).  On arrival on the island, participants remove footwear and socks before commencing vocal prayers, walking around the island.  A 24-hour night vigil then takes place on the first night. Generally, pilgrims depart on the morning of the third day having slept on their second night. They complete their pilgrimage fast at midnight the day of departure.  The pilgrimage is suitable for persons over 15 years. Pilgrims must be able to walk and kneel unaided and be physically able to undertake the fast.

Islands

Including Station Island, there are about 30 islands and islets in Lough Derg, including:
Allingham's Island
Ash Island
Boat Island
Bull's Island
Derg Beg Island
Derg More Island
Friar's Island
Goose Lodge
Gravelands Islands
Illan Philipboy
Inishgoosk
Kelly's Isles
Long Island
Saints Island (on which there is a graveyard and the buried ruins of a monastery)
Trough Island

Folklore 
According to folklore a man named Conan once threw a worm into the lake. The worm then grew into a large monster called Caoránach that devoured the local cattle. Once a majority of the cattle in Ulster died the locals blamed Conan who then enraged attacked the beast, killing it. Its blood dyed the rocks red and this is where the name Lough Derg comes from.

See also
List of loughs in Ireland

References

Derg